Thaai Naadu is a 1989 Indian Tamil-language film, written and directed by R. Aravindraj. The film stars Sathyaraj and Raadhika. It was released on 16 February 1989.

Plot 
In the 60s...

A military officer (Sathyaraj) is accused, inequitably, of giving intelligence to the enemy, during an operation, code named Day Break.

He is later murdered, before he can bring out the truth. The murder was made up as a suicide by the criminals.

Four of his subordinates are suspected, his comrades-in-arms (the traitors of the story) who said they were his friends.

The name of the serviceman is banished forever and his family was delivered to the vindication of the people, who set on fire their place of residence, in reprisal.

His son (played also by Sathyaraj), informed of his origins, starts an investigation of his father, to wash his honour and find the real culprits...

The film has an intuitive story line with Sathyaraj enacting a dual role. The role of an army officer was appreciated by the critics.

Cast 
 Sathyaraj as Albert, alias Anandhan & Brigadier (Three stars) Tamizhmani, father of Anandhan
 Raadhika as Julie
 M. N. Nambiar as Saleem Bhai
 Jaishankar as Christopher, Photographer officer
 Captain Raju as Ramoji alias Colonel Ramasundhar
 Srividya as Meenatchi Amma, mother of Anandhan
 Janagaraj as Samuel
 Nassar as S.K.T. alias Major S. Krishna Tulasi
 Kitty as Lieutenant Colonel Prithiviraj
 Krishnamoorthi as Raja
 Logu
 John
 Ilavarasan as advocat Pandhiyan
 Kokila as Ramiya, Anandhan's sister & advocat Pandhiyan's wife
 P. R. Varalakshmi as a sister
 "Hemnag" Babu

Soundtrack 
The music was composed by Manoj–Gyan, with lyrics by Aabavanan.

Reception 
The Indian Express wrote, "A routine story of revenge flashily told with the script adopting a zig-zag course to hide away the cliches".

References

External links 
 

1980s Tamil-language films
1989 films
Films about military personnel
Films directed by R. Aravindraj
Films scored by Manoj–Gyan
Indian Army in films